Spyridium minutum is a species of flowering plant in the family Rhamnaceae and is endemic to the south of Western Australia. It is an erect or spreading shrub with broadly egg-shaped or heart-shaped leaves, and groups of two or three hairy, white flowers.

Description
The edges of the leaves are turned down and the lower surface is densely covered with white hairs. Flowering occurs from March to May.

Taxonomy
Spyridium minutum was first formally described in 1995 by Barbara Lynette Rye in the Nuytsia from specimens collected in 1992. The specific epithet (minutum) means "minute", referring to the size of the plant and all its parts.

Distribution
This spyridium grows on plains in the Coolgardie, Esperance Plains and Mallee bioregions of southern Western Australia.

References

minutum
Rosales of Australia
Flora of Western Australia
Plants described in 1995
Taxa named by Barbara Lynette Rye